To the Fore is a 2015 Hong Kong-Chinese sports drama film filmed in Taiwan and other countries (including China, Korea, Mongolia and Switzerland), directed by Dante Lam, and starring Eddie Peng, Shawn Dou, Choi Siwon and Wang Luodan. The film was released on 6 August 2015 in Hong Kong and Singapore, and 7 August 2015 in Taiwan, China and the United States. The film was selected as the Hong Kong entry for the Best Foreign Language Film at the 88th Academy Awards but it was neither shortlisted nor nominated.

Plot
The story is about Jiu Ming (Eddie Peng) and Qiu Tian (Shawn Dou), who have recently joined a Taiwan Category III cycling team called Radiant. They compete in domestic and international continental road races. After some time, the team has to break up because it doesn't have sufficient money to continue operations. The members disperse to different teams.

Cast
 Eddie Peng
 Shawn Dou
 Choi Siwon 
 Wang Luodan
 Carlos Chan
Nana Ou-Yang
 Andrew Lin

Reception
To the Fore was nominated and won the awards of Outstanding Film at 2016 annual China Huabiao Film Awards, one of the three main film awards in mainland China. It was also nominated for Best Cinematography and Best Film Editing at the Hong Kong Film Awards in 2016; and for Best Editing at the Golden Rooster Awards in 2017.

Reviewer Maggie Lee of Variety wrote that "Pakie Chan's lensing captures peloton formations and breakneck sprints from dynamic angles, while the aerial photography by Tsai Chia-ling highlights Taiwan’s lush, mountainous landscapes."

Awards and nominations

See also
 List of submissions to the 88th Academy Awards for Best Foreign Language Film
 List of Hong Kong submissions for the Academy Award for Best Foreign Language Film

References

External links
 
 Filming locations in Taiwan

2015 films
Films set in Taiwan
2010s Mandarin-language films
Cycling films
Films directed by Dante Lam
IMAX films
Chinese sports films
Hong Kong sports films
Cycle racing in Taiwan
Films set in Shanghai
Films shot in Shanghai
2010s Hong Kong films